Vivint Arena, formerly known as EnergySolutions Arena and Vivint Smart Home Arena, is an indoor arena located in Salt Lake City, Utah. The arena serves as the home venue for the National Basketball Association (NBA)'s Utah Jazz, and has been the home venue for other professional athletic teams, such as the Arena Football League's Utah Blaze and the Women's National Basketball Association (WNBA)'s Utah Starzz. It seats 18,306 for basketball, 14,000 for ice hockey and indoor football, and 20,000 for concerts. It also has 56 luxury suites and 668 club seats.

Opened in 1991, the arena was known as the Delta Center, under a naming rights deal with Delta Air Lines, which has a hub at Salt Lake City International Airport. Salt Lake City-based EnergySolutions purchased the naming rights in November 2006, after Delta decided not to renew their 15-year contract due to filing for Chapter 11 bankruptcy the year prior. From 2006 to 2015, it was known as EnergySolutions Arena. On October 26, 2015, the arena was renamed as part of a 10-year naming rights contract with the Provo-based home security system provider Vivint. In August 2020, the arena dropped the "Smart Home" title to become Vivint Arena.

On January 14, 2023, it was announced that Delta Air Lines re-purchased the naming rights of the arena, to take effect on July 1, 2023. This also coincides with the Utah Jazz’s 50th anniversary season.

The arena was also home to the figure skating and short track speed skating competitions of the 2002 Winter Olympics, where it was referred to as the Salt Lake Ice Center.

History 

The arena was originally imagined as 20,000-seat home for the Utah Jazz and Salt Lake Golden Eagles to replace the since-demolished arena of the Salt Palace, which had 12,616 seats. Under the leadership and private financing of Utah businessman Larry H. Miller, ground was broken on May 22, 1990, and it was completed on October 4, 1991, in time for late-October basketball games, at a cost of $93 million ($ in  dollars). 

The first game played in the arena was a Golden Eagles match against the Peoria Rivermen on October 16, 1991, which the home team lost 4–2. The Eagles had also played the inaugural game in the Salt Palace arena when it opened on October 10, 1969.

The first basketball game played in the arena was a Jazz pre-season loss against Patrick Ewing and the New York Knicks, 101–95.

In addition to the Utah Jazz and Blaze, the arena has also been the home of the WNBA's Utah Starzz from 1997 to 2002, the Salt Lake Golden Eagles from 1991 to 1994, and the Utah Grizzlies from 1995 to 1997, both of the International Hockey League. Notably, on June 8, 1996, the Delta Center hosted what was then the largest crowd in the history of American minor league hockey: 17,381 fans attended Game 4 of the 1996 Turner Cup Finals.

The arena's roof was damaged by severe winds associated with the Salt Lake City Tornado of August 11, 1999, costing $3.757 million to repair.

Dan Roberts serves as the public address announcer for the Jazz. He has been the Jazz's home game announcer since before the arena was built.

On April 15, 2010, over a year after the death of Jazz owner Larry H. Miller, the Jazz basketball court was named in his honor.

In December 2020, Ryan Smith purchased Vivint Arena from the Miller family as part of a larger agreement including the Utah Jazz.

Upgrades and renovations 

On September 21, 2016, the Utah Jazz announced plans to renovate and upgrade the Arena. The majority of the construction related to the building's renovation, which cost $125 million. The construction began at the conclusion of the 2016–17 Utah Jazz basketball season and was completed during the Fall of 2017.

Renaming 
During the 2002 Winter Olympics, the arena was referred to as the Salt Lake Ice Center due to International Olympic Committee policies barring corporate sponsorships.

After Delta Air Lines declined to renew their 15-year naming rights contract, which expired on September 30, 2006, the arena's owner, Larry H. Miller, opted to sell naming rights to EnergySolutions, a low-level nuclear waste disposal company headquartered in Salt Lake City. The new name was unveiled November 20, prior to the Jazz home game against the Toronto Raptors. Two stickers were placed on the court, covering up the arena's old name with the new one. The temporary logos were replaced with official logos on the court sometime in December. EnergySolutions naming rights were set to expire in 2016.

Initial fan reactions to the new name were predominantly negative. Early nicknames for the arena included "the Dump," a jab at EnergySolutions' radioactive and hazardous waste disposal operations. Other suggestions included the Glow Dome, Radium Stadium, Isotope, Chernobowl, Jazzmat, Big Bang, Tox Box, Power House, Hot Spot, Plutonium Palace, Fallout Shelter, Melta Center, and Energy Pollutions Arena.

On October 26, 2015, the naming rights were acquired by the locally based home security and automation provider Vivint in a 10-year contract.

On January 14, 2023, Delta Air Lines re-purchased the naming rights to the arena, and effective July 1, the building would return to the Delta Center name for the first time since September 30, 2006.

Recognition 
Vivint Arena is well known for being one of the hardest places to play for visiting teams in the NBA. According to an NBA Players Poll taken by Sports Illustrated on February 11, 2008, the Vivint Arena is considered "the most intimidating arena in the NBA" with 20% of the vote made up of 240 current NBA players. Many commentators referred to the arena as the "Decibel Center," a play on the name "Delta Center." During Game 5 of the 1997 NBA Finals, a decibel meter installed at floor level had readings of over 110 decibels, close to the noise generated by a jet takeoff. Also, during the 1997 NBA Finals, NBC's Hannah Storm called the then-named Delta Center "one of the loudest places in sports."

Notable events

Other sports 
The arena hosted the 1999 U.S. Figure Skating Championships. The figure skating and short track speed skating competitions of the 2002 Winter Olympics were held at the arena.

The arena held Utah's first UFC event on August 6, 2016, for UFC Fight Night: Rodríguez vs. Caceres. The arena held its first UFC pay-per-view event on August 20, 2022, for UFC 278: Usman vs. Edwards 2.

Beginning in 2021, the arena began hosting Frozen Fury, a National Hockey League preseason series between the Los Angeles Kings and the Vegas Golden Knights.

Concerts 
In addition to sports, the arena was intended to host large music concerts. On October 24, 1991, Oingo Boingo became the first headlining act to play the Delta Center.

References

External links 

 

Basketball venues in Salt Lake City
College basketball venues in the United States
Indoor arenas in Salt Lake City
National Basketball Association venues
Olympic figure skating venues
Olympic short track speed skating venues
Salt Lake City Stars
Utah Jazz venues
Utah Starzz venues
Venues of the 2002 Winter Olympics
Sports venues in Salt Lake City
Sports venues completed in 1991
1991 establishments in Utah
Buildings and structures in Salt Lake City